Suzuki Ami Around the World: Live House Tour 2005 was the live house tour held by Japanese pop singer Ami Suzuki that supported her debut studio album in Avex, Around The World.

Background
It was Ami's first tour after joining the Avex trax label at the beginning of 2005. The term Live house of the tour eslogan is comparable to the English concept of music venue, in the sense of minor-scale concert tour, contrasting the ones held in big arenas. It was first announced in the period of release of Suzuki's third single in Avex "Negaigoto", with only three locations. At first, when the first album under her new label it was going to be Hopeful, the tour  was meant to be called Suzuki Ami Hopeful 2005 Tour: Live House de Body Shake It, but after the album title was changed, so it was the name of the tour. Despite of being a low-scale concert tour, Suzuki Ami Around the World: Live House Tour 2005 featured an interlude video shown in the beginning of the concert, and various changes of clothing. It even included virtual wings that appeared from Suzuki's back with feathers falling from all around the stage, while singing "Negaigoto", her song chosen to formally close the concert.

The concert main target was to promote her Avex material, and all the songs from the album were included in the set list, including also the b-sides that were not included in the album. However, Suzuki also performed some of her previous Avex songs, such as her 2004 indie single "Tsuyoi Kizuna", and two of her biggest hits from her Sony era in the encore.

Set list

Tour dates

DVD release

Information
The DVD version of the concert was released on February 8, 2006, the same day as Suzuki's sixth single in Avex, "Fantastic". It included mainly footage from Zepp Nagoya. Only the Avex-licensed songs were included, with the exception of Suzuki's indie song "Tsuyoi Kizuna". There were also added some behind the scenes footage from the three locations as bonus material, including some live excerpts from the "Tsuyoi Kizuna" performance in Zepp Tokyo, where Ami couldn't sing some of the parts because she started crying on stage.

On its first day in the Oricon DVD charts, the tour peaked at 1st place, and at the end of the week it was placed at 7th.

Track listing
Around the World
Beautiful
For Yourself
I'm Alone
Risk
Sweet Voice
About You...

Eventful
With You

Times
Hopeful
Delightful

Fantastic
Bonus Material
Off-Shot
2005.10.21 at Zepp Tokyo
2005.10.23 at Nanba Hatch
2005.11.06 at Zepp Nagoya

Charts
Oricon Sales Chart (Japan)

References

Ami Suzuki live albums
Ami Suzuki video albums
2006 live albums
2006 video albums
Live video albums